Gmina Bełżec is a rural gmina (administrative district) in Tomaszów Lubelski County, Lublin Voivodeship, in eastern Poland.

Villages
Gmina Bełżec contains the villages and settlements of Bełżec, Chyże, Smoliska, Szalenik-Kolonia, and Zagóra.

Neighbouring gminas
Gmina Bełżec is bordered by the gminas of Lubycza Królewska, Narol, and Tomaszów Lubelski.

References

External links
Polish official population figures 2006

Belzec
Tomaszów Lubelski County